The Sears House is a historic house on Moss Lane, southeast of the junction of Arkansas Highways 38 and 319 in Austin, Arkansas.  It is a single story wood-frame structure, with a side gable roof, weatherboard siding, and a foundation of wood and concrete blocks.  The roof gable is bracketed in the Italianate style, while the main entrance is sheltered by a project gabled Greek Revival portico.  The house was built about 1860 and is a rare surviving example of an antebellum late Greek Revival-Italianate house.

The house was listed on the National Register of Historic Places in 1992.

See also
National Register of Historic Places listings in Lonoke County, Arkansas

References

Houses on the National Register of Historic Places in Arkansas
Greek Revival architecture in Arkansas
Italianate architecture in Arkansas
Houses completed in 1860
Houses in Lonoke County, Arkansas
National Register of Historic Places in Lonoke County, Arkansas
1860 establishments in Arkansas